Governor Herbert may refer to:

Gary Herbert (born 1947), 17th Governor of Utah
Henry Herbert, 10th Earl of Pembroke (1734–1794), Governor of Portsmouth
John Herbert (Conservative politician) (1895–1943), Governor of Bengal from 1939 to 1943
Thomas J. Herbert (1894–1974), 56th Governor of Ohio

See also
Robert Herbert (1831–1905), 1st Premier of Queensland
Herbert H. Lehman (1878–1963), 45th Governor of New York